Duel Personality is a 1966 Tom and Jerry cartoon produced and directed by Chuck Jones. It is the first Tom and Jerry cartoon released in 1966, with animation by Don Towsley, Tom Ray, Dick Thompson, Ben Washam and Ken Harris. It is also the first Tom & Jerry cartoon (both regarding Tom and Jerry produced by Chuck Jones, and Tom and Jerry cartoons produced altogether) with Dean Elliott as the music composer.

This is one of the very few shorts in which Tom emerges victorious over Jerry.

The title of this cartoon is a play on the concept of a dual personality, scientifically known as dissociative identity disorder.

Plot
In a chateau, Tom is trying to squash Jerry with a heavy iron ball attached to a rope. The fourth time he swings, Tom hits a loose floorboard and sends Jerry into a clothes drawer. Tom is drawing back for another strike, but Jerry signals for him to stop. Tom brakes and catches his ball, but falls to the ground due to its weight. Jerry slaps him with a glove and Tom claps his hand to the slapped cheek in shock, taken aback by Jerry using a hand slap with one of his own gloves. Tom hands Jerry his card. After Jerry reads it, he throws it aside and hands Tom his card (Tom puts on his focus lens), thus challenging each other to a duel. After the opening credits, the two are seen walking towards each other, each wearing a top hat and cape, ready for the duel.

First challenge: Pistols

Jerry and Tom march away from each other with pistols, but Jerry staggers with the weight of the pistol and it fires at Tom, hitting him in the backside, and Tom's pistol goes off. Jerry snickers, but Tom's pistol ball gives him his well-deserved karma.

Second challenge: Swords

Tom and Jerry rattle their swords, but Jerry ends up twisting his into a hook. Jerry throws his boomerang-sword which spears Tom in the back on its return, making Tom throw his sword in pain up into the air. Jerry giggles again, but Tom's sword lands into the ground right next to him, hammering the mouse into the ground again.

Third challenge: Archery

Tom and Jerry both draw arrows, but end up shooting themselves instead. They hit each other head-to-head and the screen explodes.

Fourth challenge: Cannons

Both rivals set up cannons and fire, but instead, the cannonballs hit, causing the two cannons to crash back into their firers, and fall to the ground.

Final challenge: Slingshots

Tom and Jerry march away from each other with a slingshot and rock for each. Jerry sets his slingshot up in the ground, draws it back and shoots his rock into Tom's stomach as he is turning around. Tom is pushed into a tree but fires his rock, which latches onto Jerry's slingshot and pushes him back into another tree. Tom's rock then returns and latches onto his slingshot. Tom ducks his head, but peers back at it and watches it hit his face - "BLAP!" Tom is then fired into Jerry's slingshot and hits Jerry in the face - "BLAP!" Tom is then launched back the other way and gets stuck inside a tree branch with his feet sticking out.

Jerry hurries away before Tom frees himself and starts a chase. The chase through the mansion is repeated (this time with a slight increase in footage speed), but this time when Jerry issues the challenge, Tom declines by tearing up the card. He then pursues Jerry with the glove, slapping him repeatedly with it as he chases Jerry down the hall as the cartoon closes.

Crew
Co-Director & Layouts: Maurice Noble
Story, Producer & Director: Chuck Jones
Co-Story: Michael Maltese
Animation: Don Towsley, Tom Ray, Dick Thompson, Ben Washam & Ken Harris
Backgrounds: Philip DeGuard
Vocal Effects: June Foray, Chuck Jones (uncredited) & Mel Blanc (uncredited)
Production Manager: Earl Jonas
Music: Dean Elliott
Production Supervisor: Les Goldman

References

External links

1966 animated films
1966 short films
1966 films
1960s animated short films
Tom and Jerry short films
Short films directed by Chuck Jones
1960s American animated films
1966 comedy films
Films set in the Victorian era
Films scored by Dean Elliott
Animated films without speech
Films directed by Maurice Noble
Metro-Goldwyn-Mayer short films
Metro-Goldwyn-Mayer animated short films
MGM Animation/Visual Arts short films
Works about dueling
Films with screenplays by Michael Maltese